Pickmere is a civil parish in Cheshire East, England.  It contains two buildings that are recorded in the National Heritage List for England as designated listed buildings, both of which are at Grade II.  This grade is the lowest of the three gradings given to listed buildings and is applied to "buildings of national importance and special interest".  Both the listed buildings originated as farmhouses.

See also

 Listed buildings in Tabley Superior
 Listed buildings in Tabley Inferior
 Listed buildings in Plumley
 Listed buildings in Wincham
 Listed buildings in Marston
 Listed buildings in Great Budworth

References
Citations

Sources

 

Listed buildings in the Borough of Cheshire East
Lists of listed buildings in Cheshire